The Jeppiaar Educational Trust under the leadership of Founder-Chairman and Managing Trustee Dr.Jeppiaar, was formed in 1987. St.Marys School of Management is one of the institutions of the Jeppiaar Educational Trust and was established in 1996.  The college is a Christian minority institution.

Affiliation
The school is affiliated to the Anna University  and approved by the government of Tamil Nadu.

Transport
The institution has buses which are made available to the students and the staff members for commuting from around the city.

Facilities
The school has computer labs, library, and class rooms.
MCA - 42 students.
MBA - 150 students.

Courses
 Master of Business Administration
 Master of Computer Applications

Educational institutions established in 1996
Business schools in Chennai
1996 establishments in Tamil Nadu